Scarborough Beach Road is an arterial northwest–southeast road located in the inner northern suburbs of Perth, Western Australia. It connects North Perth to Scarborough Beach, and is mostly a single carriageway road, with two or three lanes in each direction. The road is the western section of State Route 75, between Osborne Park and Scarborough, and a short section in Innaloo is also part of State Route 64.

History
North Beach Road (the original road name)  and was built to offer access to Osborne Park, which at the beginning of the 20th century was rural community with established agriculture including market gardens, pig farms, dairy farms, and poultry farms. Whilst it was a formed road from North Perth to the corner of Frobisher Road, there was only a sand track beyond this point to Njookenbooroo, now known as Innaloo. A plank road, completed in 1912, replaced this sand track, and "some years later", a limestone road extension to Brighton Road, near the coast, was built. By 1925 the road had been renamed as Scarborough Beach Road, and was classified as an arterial road by Mr. Arundale, the Perth Road Board engineer in 1925. By 1933, the plank roads in the area had been replaced by regular roads, but these roads were narrow and many accidents occurred due to increase in traffic associated with Scarborough Beach's rising popularity. The increasing traffic meant that the road was continually being upgraded, including a partial reconstruction by the Main Roads Department in 1938. In the 1950s, prior to the development of shopping centres at Karrinyup and Innaloo, the Mount Hawthorn section of the road was a popular shopping area.

Route Description
Scarborough Beach Road begins at Charles Street, in North Perth, as the continuation of Angove Street. The road travels north-west through Mount Hawthorn, which has been a shopping destination since the beginning of the 20th century. Axford Park, at the intersection of Oxford Street in Mount Hawthorn, is named in honour of World War I Victoria Cross recipient Thomas Axford. At Main Street, the road turns west and continues in this direction until Frobisher Street, along what was originally part of Green Street. The Glendalough railway station, built in 1992, picks up passengers on the road underneath the Mitchell Freeway bridge, in between Main Street and Frobisher Street. Scarborough Beach Road is one of only two arterial roads between Perth and Joondalup (along with Beach Road) that doesn't have an interchange with the Mitchell Freeway, although there is a "bus and taxi only" service road that is a southbound entrance ramp. Past here, the road continues north-west around Herdsman Lake, through the Osborne Park commercial centre to Innaloo. The Westfield Innaloo shopping centre, a large cinema and a tavern are located around the Odin Road/Liege Street/Ellen Stirling Boulevard intersections, which also carry traffic to the Mitchell Freeway, via Cedric Street. The Stirling railway station is located at that interchange. The road continues to travel north-west until Hancock Street, Doubleview, after which it heads west to Scarborough Beach.

Intersections

See also

References

External links

Roads in Perth, Western Australia